The letters FSRA could refer to:
 FsrA, a type of RNA.
 Financial Services Regulatory Authority of Ontario, a Crown agency responsible for oversight of the financial industry in Ontario, Canada.
 Formula Sidecar Racing Association, the association administering sidecar racing in the United Kingdom.